Hockey Punks Vilnius is an ice hockey team located in Vilnius, Lithuania, which plays in the Lithuania Hockey League, the top tier of ice hockey in Lithuania. They play home games at the Pramogų arena.

History
Hockey Punks Vilnius were founded in 2007 when Lithuanian national team players Šarūnas Kuliešius and Martynas Šlikas started popularising the sport in the capital. Interest in the sport further increased following the launch of 'Heat on Ice' on Tango TV. Heat on Ice was a weekly show covering the latest hockey news and highlights from around the world, with celebrity guests. One of these guests was G&G Sindikatas rapper Gabrielius 'Svaras' Liaudanskas who would go on to be a prominent supporter of the team, often promoting Hockey Punks in interviews. Svaras would subsequently play for the team for 6 years, as did his bandmate Andrius 'Pushaz' Glušakovas.

Initially, Hockey Punks focused solely on training, before ultimately joining the Lithuanian second tier in 2010. Their first season was a tough one, only winning one game whilst suffering a goal difference of -41. Three seasons later, Hockey Punks were admitted to the Lithuania Hockey League, where they have played since. During their time in the NLRL, Hockey Punks have not won the league, however, they have lost in the playoff finals on two occasions; in 2016 and 2019.

Between 2013 and 2017 former NHL star and Olympic gold medalist Darius Kasparaitis played sporadically for the Hockey Punks in order to qualify for the Lithuanian national team, having previously represented Russia. During this time with the team Kasparaitis played 7 games for the Hockey Punks, registering 22 points.

In 2020 Hockey Punks took part in the inaugural Baltic Hockey League, a competition made up of two teams from each of Estonia, Latvia and Lithuania. The team finished 2nd in their group after beating Estonian side HC Everest, but losing to Latvia's HK Liepāja, and therefore qualified for the final round, scheduled for February 2021.

Roster
Updated January 22, 2021.

Season-by-season record
Note: GP = Games played, W = Wins, L = Losses, T = Ties, OTL = Overtime losses, Pts = Points, GF = Goals for, GA = Goals against, PIM = Penalties in minutes

Team records

Career
These are the top five scorers in Hockey Punks history.

''Note: Pos = Position; GP = Games played; G = Goals; A = Assists; Pts = Points

Penalty minutes: Modestas Kartenis, 188

Season

Regular season 
 Most goals in a season: Edgar Rybakov, 21(2017–18)
 Most assists in a season: Edgar Rybakov, 29 (2017–18)
 Most points in a season: Edgar Rybakov, 50 (2017–18)
 Most penalty minutes in a season: Lukas Jonuska, 90 (2019–20)

Playoffs 
 Most goals in a playoff season: Mindaugas Kieras, 6 (2017–18)
 Most assists in a playoff season: Sarunas Suchomlinas, 10 (2017–18)
 Most points in a playoff season: Mindaugas Kieras, 11 (2017–18)
 Most penalty minutes in a playoff season: Sergei Markovsky, 31 (2018–19)

Notable players
 Darius Kasparaitis
 Gabrielius 'Svaras' Liaudanskas
 Andrius 'Pushaz' Glušakovas

References

External links
  
 

Sport in Vilnius
Ice hockey teams in Lithuania
Latvian Hockey League teams
Lithuanian Hockey League teams
Ice hockey clubs established in 2007
2007 establishments in Lithuania